Leslie C. Smith is a retired United States Army lieutenant general who last served as the 66th Inspector General of the United States Army.

Military career
From 1981 to 1985, Smith earned a Bachelor of Business Administration in Accounting from Georgia Southern University, then went on to study for a Master of Science in Accounting from Central Michigan University and then a Master of Arts in National Security and Strategic Studies from the National Defense University.

On graduation from Georgia Southern University, Smith was also commissioned as a Field Artillery Officer in the United States Army and then assigned as a Chemical Army Officer. Smith has Chemical Officer Basic and Advanced Courses and is a graduate of the Airborne School, United States Army Jumpmaster School, Command and General Staff College and National War College.

His retirement ceremony was held on August 27, 2021, though he remained The Inspector General until September 1. LTG Donna W. Martin became the 67th Inspector General of the United States Army on September 2, 2021.

Honors and awards
Smith's honors and awards include:

 Army Distinguished Service Medal with one bronze oak leaf cluster
 Legion of Merit with one bronze oak leaf cluster
 Bronze Star Medal with one bronze oak leaf cluster
 Defense Meritorious Service Medal
 Meritorious Service Medal with two bronze oak leaf clusters
 Army Commendation Medal with one bronze oak leaf cluster
 Joint Service Achievement Medal
 National Defense Service Medal with one bronze service star
 Armed Force Expeditionary Medal
 Southwest Asia Service Medal with two service stars
 Global War on Terrorism Expeditionary Medal
 Global War on Terrorism Service Medal
 Korea Defense Service Medal
 Armed Forces Reserve Medal
 Army Service Ribbon
 Army Overseas Service Ribbon
 Kuwait Liberation Medal (Saudi Arabia)
 Kuwait Liberation Medal (Kuwait)
 Army Meritorious Unit Commendation
 Senior Parachutist Badge
 Joint Chiefs of Staff Identification Badge
 Army Staff Identification Badge
 College of Business Administration Alumni Award

References

Year of birth missing (living people)
Living people
Georgia Southern University alumni
Central Michigan University alumni
National Defense University alumni
United States Army generals
Inspectors General of the United States Army